The 2021–22 Bulgarian Cup was the 40th official edition of the Bulgarian annual football knockout tournament. It was sponsored by Sesame and known as the Sesame Kupa na Bulgaria for sponsorship purposes. The competition began on 4 September 2021 with the preliminary round and finished with the final on 15 May 2022. CSKA Sofia were the defending cup winners. They reached the final for 3rd consecutive time, but lost to Levski Sofia, who won the cup for a record 26th time and also qualified for the second qualifying round of the 2022–23 UEFA Europa Conference League.

Participating clubs
The following 47 teams qualified for the competition:

Matches

Preliminary round
The draw was conducted on 27 August 2021. The games were played between 4 and 8 September 2021. In this stage participated 16 winners from the regional amateur competitions and 17 non-reserve teams from Second League. During the draw, Rozova Dolina Kazanlak, Septemvri Simitli and Septemvri Sofia received a bye to the Round of 32.

Round of 32
The draw was conducted on 27 August 2021. The games were played between 21 and 23 September 2021. In this stage participated the 15 winners from the first round, the three byes, as well as the 14 teams from First League.

Round of 16
The draw was conducted on 23 September 2021. The games were played between 26 October and 17 November 2021. In this stage the participants are the 16 winners from the previous round.

Quarter-finals
The draw was conducted on 28 October 2021. The games were played between 1 and 3 March 2022. In this stage the participants are the 8 winners from the previous round.

Semi-finals
The draw was conducted on 4 March 2022. The first legs should be played on 12 and 13 April, while the second legs are scheduled for 21 and 22 April 2022. Contrary to the generally accepted regulations in European football, the away goals rule will apply.

First legs

Second legs

Final

Bracket

Notes

References

Bulgarian Cup seasons
Bulgarian Cup
Cup